Mireia Epelde (born 29 October 1985) is a Spanish racing cyclist. She competed in the 2013 UCI women's team time trial in Florence.

References

External links
 

1985 births
Living people
Spanish female cyclists
People from Azpeitia
Sportspeople from Gipuzkoa
Cyclists from the Basque Country (autonomous community)